Agostino Accorimboni (28 August 1739 - 13 August 1818), last name also given as Accoramboni, Accorimbeni or Accorrimboni,  was an Italian composer known mostly for his operas. He composed thirteen operas of which ten premiered in Rome between 1770 and 1785.

Operas 
  1765
  (1768)
  (1770)
  (1772)
  (1774)
  (1777)
  (1777)
  (1778)
  (1778)
  (1779)
  (1780)
  (1783)
  (1783)
  (1785)

References

1739 births
1818 deaths
18th-century Italian composers
19th-century classical composers
Italian male classical composers
Italian opera composers
Male opera composers
19th-century Italian composers
18th-century Italian male musicians
19th-century Italian male musicians